This is the discography of Glenn Hughes English rock bassist and vocalist, best known for playing bass and performing vocals for funk rock pioneers Trapeze and the Mk. III and IV line-ups of Deep Purple, as well as briefly fronting Black Sabbath in the mid-1980s. In addition to being an active session musician, Hughes also maintains a notable solo career; in recent years, he has been the frontman of the supergroup Black Country Communion until their disband in 2013 and California Breed until their disband in 2015. Black Country Communion reformed in 2016 and released their latest album BCCIV, and are also planning a follow up sometime in 2021. In 2020 he joined The Dead Daisies and performs vocals & bass on their latest album Holy Ground, which was released in January 2021.

Solo discography

Studio albums

Live albums

Compilation & EPs

Collaborations

As band member

With others

 Roger Glover and Guests – The Butterfly Ball and the Grasshopper's Feast (1974)
 Jon Lord – Windows (1974)
 Tommy Bolin – Teaser (1975)
Various Artists – The Wizard's Convention (1976)
 Pat Travers – Makin' Magic (1977)
 The Chromatics – Hot Stuff / Jookin at the Joint (1980)
 Climax Blues Band – Lucky for Some (1981)
 Night Ranger – Midnight Madness (1983)
 Heaven – Where Angels Fear to Tread (1983)
 Phenomena – Phenomena (1985)
 Phenomena – Dream Runner (1987)
 Gary Moore – Run For Cover (1985)
Various Artists – Dragnet (motion picture soundtrack) (1987)
 Whitesnake – Slip of the Tongue (1989)
 XYZ – same (1989)
 Notorious – same (1990)
 Various Artists – Music from and Inspired by the Film Highlander II: The Quickening (1990)
 John Norum – Face The Truth (1992)
 The KLF – "America: What Time Is Love?" (single) (1992)
 Lynch Mob – same (1992)
 Geoff Downes/The New Dance Orchestra – Vox Humana (European version) (1993)
Sister Whiskey – Liquor and Poker (1993)
 Marc Bonilla – American Matador (1993)
 George Lynch – Sacred Groove (1993)
 Stevie Salas – Stevie Salas Presents: The Electric Pow Wow (1993)
 Mötley Crüe – Mötley Crüe (1994)
 Manfred Ehlert's Amen – same (1994)
 Various Artists – Smoke on the Water: A Tribute (1994)
 L.A. Blues Authority Volume V – Cream of the Crop: A Tribute (1994)
 Hank Davison & Friends – Real Live (1995)
 Brazen Abbot – Live and Learn (1995)
 Wet Paint – Shhh..! (1995)
 Richie Kotzen – Wave of Emotion (1996)
 Liesegang – No Strings Attached (1996)
 Asia – Archiva Vol. 1 (1996)
 Various Artists – To Cry You a Song: A Collection of Tull Tales (1996)
 Various Artists – Dragon Attack: A Tribute to Queen (1996)
 Amen – Aguilar (1996)
 Stuart Smith – Heaven and Earth (1998)
 Various Artists – Humanary Stew: A Tribute to Alice Cooper (1999)
 Various Artists – Encores, Legends & Paradox: A Tribute to the Music of ELP (1999)
 The Bobaloos – The Bobaloos (1999)
 Niacin – Deep (1999)
 Erik Norlander – Into the Sunset (2000)
 Tidewater Grain – Here on the Outside (2000)
 Craig Erickson Project – Shine (2000)
 Nikolo Kotzev – Nostradamus (2001)
 Max Magagni – Twister (2001)
 Various Artists – Stone Cold Queen: A Tribute (2001)
 Various Artists – Another Hair of the Dog – A Tribute to Nazareth (2001)
 Various Artists – Let the Tribute Do the Talking – A Tribute to Aerosmith (2001)
 Ape Quartet – Please Where Do We Live? (2001)
 Voices of Classic Rock – Voices for America (2001)
 Ellis – Ellis Three (E-III) (2001)
 The Alchemist – Songs from the Westside (2002)
 An All Star Lineup Performing the Songs of Pink Floyd – same (2002)
 Ryo Okumoto – Coming Through (2002)
 Jeff Scott Soto – Prism (2002)
 Various Artists – Influences & Connections, Volume 1, Mr.Big (2003)
 Chris Catena – Freak Out! (2003)
 Aina – Days of Rising Doom (2003)
 Monkey Business – Kiss Me On My Ego (2005)
 Vargas Blues Band – Love, Union, Peace (2005): Vocals on "Sad Eyes"
 Various Artists – Back Against the Wall (2005)
 Various Artists – "'Stealth' Music From The Motion Picture" (2005)
Moonstone Project – Time to Take a Stand (2006)
The Lizards – Against All Odds (2006)
 Quiet Riot – Rehab (2006)
 Ken Hensley – Blood On The Highway (2007)
Jake E. Lee – Runnin' with the Devil (2008)
 Monkey Business – Twilight Of Jesters? (2009)
Abbey Road – A Tribute To The Beatles (2009)
Moonstone Project – Rebel On The Run (2009)
Various Artists – An All-Star Salute To Christmas (2009)
Various Artists – Childline Rocks 2009 (2009)
One Soul Thrust – 1st (2010)
Kens Dojo – Reincarnation (2010)
Mike Porcaro – Brotherly Love (2011, rec. 2002)
Pushking – The World as We Love It (2011)
Joe Bonamassa – Dust Bowl (2011)
Various Artists – Sin-Atra (2011)
The Slam – Hit It (2011)
Vargas Blues Band – Vargas Blues Band & Company (2012): Vocals on "Sad Eyes (new mixed)"
Ken Hensley – Love & Other Mysteries  (2012)
Various Artists – Re-Machined: A Tribute to Deep Purple's Machine Head (2012)
Device – Device (2013)
 Gov't Mule – Shout! (2013)
 Various Artists – Ronnie James Dio This Is Your Life (2014)
 Various Artists – Rock Against Trafficking (2014)
 Billy Ray Cyrus – Still the King (2015, single)
 The Lizards – Reptilicus Maximus (2015)
 The Dead Daisies – Holy Ground (2021)

Film & TV appearances
1975 Deep Purple Rises Over Japan (performer) – re-issued on DVD "Phoenix Rising" in 2011
1977 The Butterfly Ball (performer)
1981 Deep Purple – California Jam (Video, performer) – re-issued in 2006 on DVD
1989 The Ultimate Tommy Bolin Documentary (TV, interviewee)
1991 Deep Purple – Heavy Metal Pioneers (Video, Warner, archive footage)
1992 The Black Sabbath Story Vol. 2 (Video, archive footage)
1995 Rock Family Trees, ep. 'Deep Purple''' (BBC TV, interviewee)
2005 Burn – The Ultimate Critical Review (Video, interviewee)
2005 Heavy: The Story of Metal, ep. 'Looks That Kill' (VH1 TV, interviewee)
2008 Guitar Gods – Ritchie Blackmore (Video, interviewee)
2008 Deep Purple – In Their Own Words (Video, interviewee)
2009 A Shot of Whisky (History of The Whisky A Go Go club in LA) (TV, interviewee)
2011 Deep Purple – Phoenix Rising (Video, interviewee)
2011 Metal Evolution (TV mini-series, interviewee)
2013 Behind The Music Remastered, ep. Deep Purple (TV, interviewee)

Music videos
1982 I Got Your Number (with Pat Thrall)
1982 The Look In Your Eye (with Pat Thrall)
1986 No Stranger To Love (with Black Sabbath)
1987 City of Crime (Dan Aykroyd/Tom Hanks) – from the "Dragnet" movie
1992 America (What Time Is Love) (with KLF)
1994 Pickin' Up The Pieces1994 Why Don't You Stay1995 Save Me Tonight2000 Days Of Avalon2005 Soul Mover2006 Black Light2006 The Divine2006 This House (dir. Jon Cohan)
2007 Monkey Man (featuring Jimmy Barnes)
2008 Love Communion2009 Gumball (with Monkey Business)
2011 Man In The Middle'' (with Black Country Communion)

References

External links
 Discography at Glenn Hughes official website

Rock music group discographies
Discographies of British artists